Elizabeth Anne Hakaraia  is a New Zealand Māori film producer and director. Her iwi are Ngāti Kapumanawawhiti, Ngāti Raukawa, Ngāti Toa Rangatira and Te Āti Awa.

Biography 
Hakaraia was raised in Lower Hutt and started her broadcasting career at Radio Waikato when she was 17 years old. When she was 20, she moved to Radio Aotearoa and later to the Australian Broadcasting Corporation. After some time living and working in Europe she returned to New Zealand and worked on National Radio’s Māori magazine show Whenua.

In the later 1990s Hakaraia began researching, producing, writing and directing documentaries and television series. In 2004 she founded her own production company, Blue Bach Productions.

In 2014 Hakaraia established the Māoriland Film Festival; two years later the Māoriland Charitable Trust opened a cinema and arts space which Hakaraia manages.

Hakaraia has been a jury member at ImagineNATIVE, the world’s largest indigenous film festival, and an executive member of Screen Production and Development Association and Ngā Aho Whakaari. In the early 200s Hakaraia wrote a book for adult readers and another for children about Matariki, a Māori celebration of the new year.

In the 2022 Queen's Birthday Honours, Hakaraia was appointed a Member of the New Zealand Order of Merit, for services to the film and media industries.

Filmography

Publications 

 Hakaraia, L. (2008). Matariki: The Māori New Year. North Shore, N.Z: Raupo.
 Hakaraia, L., & Urlich, C. W. (2008). Te kahui o Matariki: Contemporary Māori art for Matariki. North Shore City, N.Z: Raupo.
 Hakaraia, L. (2004). Matariki. Auckland, N.Z.: Reed.

References

Te Āti Awa people
New Zealand film directors
New Zealand film producers
Ngāti Toa people
Ngāti Raukawa people
People from Lower Hutt
Members of the New Zealand Order of Merit

Living people
Year of birth missing (living people)